Wayne Elliot Davis (July 17, 1963 – March 16, 2008) was an American football cornerback in the National Football League for the San Diego Chargers, the Buffalo Bills, and the Washington Redskins.  He played college football at Indiana State University.

High school career
Davis started his career as a running back and played high school football at Mount Healthy High School in Cincinnati, Ohio.

College career
Davis played college football at Indiana State University, where he first started playing cornerback.  Davis received three NCAA All-America honors in 1984, including the Missouri Valley Conference Defensive Player of the Year award.  In 2002, he was inducted into the ISU Athletics Hall of Fame.

Davis was a member of Phi Beta Sigma fraternity.

Professional career
Davis was drafted in the second round of the 1985 NFL Draft by the San Diego Chargers. He then had a six-year career in the NFL and played for the Chargers, Buffalo Bills and Washington Redskins. In his professional career, he totaled five interceptions in 73 games (14 starts).

He was a member of the 1988 AFC East Champions Buffalo Bills, appearing in both post-season games for the Bills.

Davis died of amyotrophic lateral sclerosis on March 16, 2008, at the age of 44.

References

1963 births
2008 deaths
Deaths from motor neuron disease
Neurological disease deaths in the United States
American football cornerbacks
Buffalo Bills players
Indiana State Sycamores football players
Players of American football from Cincinnati
San Diego Chargers players
Washington Redskins players